Croydon is an inner western suburb of Adelaide, South Australia. It is located in the City of Charles Sturt.

History

The land on which the suburb now stands was purchased in 1853 by Alfred Watts and Philip Levi. The village may have been named after Croydon, England, then a part of Surrey, the same county in which Levi had been born.
In 1904, market gardener and greengrocer John Brooker founded a jams and conserves business on Queen Street, producing "Croydon" branded products. The business prospered, leading to the construction of the Croydon Jam Factory on the corner of Queen Street and Princes Street in 1945. However production was soon moved to Woodville North in 1951. The Croydon factory became a warehouse for Godfreys Ltd., a whitegoods retailer.

One of Croydon's first farm barns, later converted into a home in the 1920s exists far into a lot on Bedford Street, Croydon, a true example of a Brick and Stone building, proving Croydon's true history.  This Original Barn, now renovated into a family home is believed to have been built by Richard Day who developed the suburb some 100 odd years ago. Richard Day, founder of Croydon, South Australia. Developed his own Huge Villa cottage on the site of 14 St Lawrence Ave in Croydon, it was demolished around the time of 1970 and a retirement village was built. A long dusty driveway starting from south road led to this Cottage. The original barn of this home still remains on Bedford St, Croydon. At this time, Croydon was mainly farmland.

Geography

Demographics

The 2021 Census by the Australian Bureau of Statistics counted 1,220 persons in Croydon on census night. Of these, 49.7% were male and 50.3% were female.

The majority of residents (72.5%) are of Australian birth, with other common census responses being Italy (4.3%), Greece (3.9%), England (3.0%), Vietnam (1.9%) and India (0.8%). Additionally, Aboriginals and/or Torres Strait Islanders contributed to 2.2% of the suburb's population.

The age distribution of Croydon residents is broadly similar to that of the greater Australian population. 72.7% of residents were over 25 years in 2021, compared to the Australian average of 69.9%; and 27.3% were younger than 25 years, compared to the Australian average of 30.1%.

In terms of religious affiliation, 40.2% of Croydon residents state that they were irreligious in 2021 (up from 33.7% in 2016), 25.2% stated that they were Catholic, 13.3% stated they were Eastern Orthodox, and 3.4% attributed themselves to being Anglican. Within Croydon, 91.3% of the residents aged > 15 years who reported being in the labour force were employed, with 3.6% being unemployed and 4.9% away from work.

Politics

Local government
Croydon is part of Hindmarsh Ward in the City of Charles Sturt local government area, being represented in that council by Labor members Paul Alexandrides and Alice Campbell.

State and federal
Croydon lies in the state electoral district of Croydon and the federal electoral division of Adelaide. The suburb is represented in the South Australian House of Assembly by leader of the South Australian opposition, Labor member Peter Malinauskas and federally by Steve Georganas.

Facilities and attractions

Shopping and dining
On Elizabeth Street, there are cafes (Billy's Table, Queen Street Cafe, Willow Bend Coffee Roasters), a bakery (Abbots and Kinney), a French Creperie (La Lorientaise), hairdressers (Curious Orange, Palladeum Hair) and retro clothing & homewares (Hype & Seek) homewares (Her name was Nola), skincare products (Brooklan Tree), clothing boutique (Azalia Boutique), photographic studio (PaperPashes) The Soul Healing Space, Human Health Chiropractic and Croydon Bookstore. Billy's Table also opens in the evening serving pizza from its wood oven and is licensed.

This section of Elizabeth Street is commonly referred to as Queen Street, and some of the names of the shops refer to Queen Street.
On Queen Street proper (which runs off Port Road until becoming Elizabeth Street) there is also a hairdresser (Palladeum Hair), a pilates studio (Queen St Pilates Studio), Queen Street Dental and a children's party venue (Lollipop's Cafe), which is situated in the former Croydon Jam Factory.
On Port Road is a warehouse shopping complex with large parking space including Officeworks, a gym, Vinnies Croydon, The Salvation Army Superstore and Godfreys Superstore.

Parks
Two parks are located on Day Terrace beside Croydon railway station. These two parks are known as Croydon Train park and Croydon playground reserve.

Queen Street Music Festival
A free street music festival is held annually on Elizabeth Street, supported by the Charles Sturt Council. This was last held on Friday 6 April 2019, hosted the local bands Dead Roo, Last Days of Kali, Rex Wonderful & the Silk Sheets, Blush response and David Blumberg & the Maraby Band.

Transportation

Roads
Croydon is bounded by Torrens Road to the north, South Road, to the east and Port Road to the south.

Day Terrace in Croydon, which runs parallel to the Outer Harbor/Grange Train Line is part of the Outer Harbor Greenway, a bicycle route, which provides a family-friendly bicycle path from the City of Adelaide to Outer Harbor via Port Adelaide.

Public transport
Croydon is well serviced by public transport run by Adelaide Metro.

Trains
The Grange and Outer Harbor train services pass through the suburb. The closest station is Croydon.

Buses
The suburb is serviced by buses run by Adelaide Metro.

See also

 List of Adelaide suburbs

References

External links

Suburbs of Adelaide
Populated places established in 1855
1855 establishments in Australia